The Deer Park Tribune is the newspaper of record for the city of Deer Park in the U.S. state of Washington, founded in 1906. It is also known as the Tri-County Tribune. Their weekly publications cover local news, sports, business, and events happening within in the community. The current editor is Raelynn Ricarte.

History 
The Deer Park Tribune has had several name changes since its original founding in 1906. The original name was Deer Park Union,  and their publisher was Charles J. Neugebauer. In 1953, the Deer Park Union combined with the Spokane County Newspaper. In 1983, the newspaper was renamed to The Argus/Tribune but was then changed again to The Tribune.

Names 
 1906 – 1953: Deer Park Union
 1953 – 19--: Tri-county Tribune
 1983: The Argus/tribune
 1983 – 1987: The Tribune
 1987 – Present: Tri-County Tribune or Deer Park Tribune

References 

Newspapers published in Washington (state)